Betta schalleri, sometimes known as Schaller's mouthbrooder, is a species of gourami. It is a freshwater fish native to Asia, where it is known only from Bangka Island in Indonesia. It is typically found in hillstreams and peat swamp forests. The species reaches 4.5 cm (1.8 inches) in standard length and is known to be a facultative air-breather.

References 

Fish described in 1994
schalleri
Fish of Indonesia